Thomas Lyle Williams Sr (January 19, 1896 – September 26, 1976) was an American cosmetician and business executive. He was the founder of cosmetic firm The Maybelline Company.

Early life and family 

Thomas Lyle Williams Sr. was born in Morganfield, Kentucky, in 1896 to Thomas "TJ" Jefferson and Susan Williams. In 1912, he married Bennie Gibbs, with whom he had one son, Thomas Lyle Williams Jr (1912–1978), who was to become the General Partner at Williams Investments and President at Maybelline Co, Chicago. The marriage did not last long, however, and after it was annulled, Williams moved to Chicago and there met Emery Shaver (September 15, 1903 – October 22, 1964), who was working part-time in advertising while studying literature at University of Chicago.

Career 
In Chicago, Williams first went to work for Montgomery Ward, a firm printing a mail-order catalog founded in 1872. After Montgomery Ward, he opened his own mail-order business. 

In 1915, Williams, then 19 years old, seeing his sister Maybel using a homemade mixture of petroleum jelly, coal dust and burnt cork to darken her eyelashes, had the idea to create a commercial product to enhance the eyes. His own attempt was not a success but then he commissioned a drug manufacturer, and the resulting product was something that he could sell: the Lash-Brow.

In 1917 Williams started producing eyebrow beautifier and cake eyelash, calling the product Maybelline, inspired by his sister Mabel. Maybelline was the first mascara produced in America. In 1929 Williams expanded the production to eye shadow and eyebrow pencils.

After World War II Maybelline became an international venture. Williams moved to California with his life partner, Emery Shaver. They bought Rudolph Valentino's house in the Hollywood Hills.  Shaver and Williams were in charge of advertising for the company, and in particular, Shaver contracted the movie stars of the time to promote Maybelline products. The headquarters of Maybelline remained in Chicago. When Shaver died in 1964, Williams was deeply affected by the loss. He sold the business in 1968. In 2001, Maybelline became "Maybelline New York".

Death 
Williams died in Los Angeles, California in 1976. He and Shaver are buried together in the Columbarium of Memories at Forest Lawn Memorial Park, Glendale, California.

References

Sources

1896 births
1976 deaths
LGBT people from Kentucky
20th-century American chemists
American business executives
People from Morganfield, Kentucky
20th-century LGBT people